Wilfred Kirochi (born 12 December 1969) is a former Kenyan middle distance runner who won a silver medal at the 1991 World Championships in Tokyo in the 1500 m event. Previously Kirochi had won two World Junior Championship titles in 1986 and 1988 (where he defeated future world and Olympic champion Noureddine Morceli).

In 1990, Kirochi also won the silver medal at the Commonwealth Games in Auckland behind Peter Elliott. Kirochi did not qualify for the 1992 Olympic Games in Barcelona, as he did not finish in the top three at the Kenyan trials in Nairobi. However, just prior to the Olympics, he won meets in Oslo and Nice, where he set a temporary world season's best. Later in the season, he improved his personal best to 3:32.49.

Achievements

References

External links

1969 births
Living people
Kenyan male middle-distance runners
Kenyan male cross country runners
World Athletics Championships athletes for Kenya
World Athletics Championships medalists
Commonwealth Games medallists in athletics
Commonwealth Games silver medallists for Kenya
Athletes (track and field) at the 1990 Commonwealth Games
African Games silver medalists for Kenya
African Games medalists in athletics (track and field)
Athletes (track and field) at the 1987 All-Africa Games
World Athletics U20 Championships winners
20th-century Kenyan people
Medallists at the 1990 Commonwealth Games